The Fokker S.III was a biplane trainer aircraft of the 1920s. It was of conventional configuration, seating the pilot and instructor in tandem, open cockpits. The single-baywings were staggered and of unequal span.

In 1927, Fokker's US subsidiary, Atlantic Aircraft imported a single example, in an attempt to interest the US Army in the type, but this did not result in a sale. The aircraft was eventually purchased by the Wright Aeronautical Corporation and used as an engine testbed until broken up in 1929.

Variants
 S.III : Two-seat primary trainer biplane.
 S-3 : One aircraft imported into the United States by Atlantic Aircraft.

Operators

Royal Danish Air Force - Two aircraft

Royal Netherlands Navy

Specifications (S.III)

References

 
 aerofiles.com

1920s Dutch military trainer aircraft
S.III
Biplanes